Leszek Kokoszka (born April 11, 1951) is a former Polish ice hockey player. He played for the Poland men's national ice hockey team at the 1976 Winter Olympics in Innsbruck, and the 1980 Winter Olympics in Lake Placid.

References

1951 births
Ice hockey players at the 1976 Winter Olympics
Ice hockey players at the 1980 Winter Olympics
Living people
Olympic ice hockey players of Poland
People from Nowy Targ
Polish ice hockey centres
Sportspeople from Lesser Poland Voivodeship